Metbah Lyngdoh is a United Democratic Party politician from Meghalaya. He has been elected in Meghalaya Legislative Assembly election in 2008, 2013 and 2018 from Mairang constituency as candidate of United Democratic Party. He was the speaker of Meghalaya Legislative Assembly. He is also United Democratic Party president after the death of Donkupar Roy. He was Minister of Excise Registration Taxation Stamps, Home (Civil Defence and Home Guards), Tourism, Water Resources in Conrad Sangma ministry from  2018 to 2019.

References 

Living people
United Democratic Party (Meghalaya) politicians
Meghalaya MLAs 2018–2023
Year of birth missing (living people)
People from West Khasi Hills district
Speakers of the Meghalaya Legislative Assembly
Meghalaya MLAs 2008–2013
Meghalaya MLAs 2013–2018